Glyphidocera digitella is a moth in the family Autostichidae. It was described by Adamski and Brown in 2001. It is found in Venezuela.

The length of the forewings is 4.9 mm. The forewing colour consists of pale brown intermixed with a few brown scales. The discal cell has two spots, one near the base, one near the distal end. There is a brown spot basad to the basal spot near the cell and brown marginal scales. The hindwings are pale brown.

Etymology
The species name refers to the fingerlike process of the apical part of the valval costa and is derived from Latin digitus (meaning finger).

References

Moths described in 2001
Taxa named by David Adamski
Glyphidocerinae